Life in Kajzar is a 1952 Slovene film directed by France Štiglic. It is based on a novel by Ivan Potrč and is set in Haloze in the Slovene countryside in the years immediately after the Second World War.

External links

Slovenian drama films
1952 films
Films directed by France Štiglic
Slovene-language films
Yugoslav drama films
Yugoslav black-and-white films
1952 drama films